Beaulac-Garthby is a municipality in Municipalité régionale de comté des Appalaches in Quebec, Canada. It is part of the Chaudière-Appalaches region and the population is 931 as of 2021. The municipality, located on Lake Aylmer, was created in 2000 following the amalgamation of the village of Beaulac and the township of Garthby.

References

Commission de toponymie du Québec
Ministère des Affaires municipales, des Régions et de l'Occupation du territoire

External links

Municipalities in Quebec
Incorporated places in Chaudière-Appalaches